Chande is a village in Mulshi taluka of Pune District in the state of Maharashtra, India. It is surrounded by Karjat taluka, Talegaon Dabhade Taluka, Mawal taluka and Khalapur taluka. The districts closest to the village are Raigad district, Thane district, Mumbai City district and Mumbai Suburban district. The railway stations nearest the village are Vadgaon railway station, Begdewadi railway station, Lonavala railway station, Talegaon railway station and Kamshet railway station.

References

External links
 Villages in Mulshi taluka 
  Villages in pune maharashtra
 List of Villages in Mulshi Tehsil

Villages in Mulshi taluka